Kim Nam-sook (born 28 October 1958) is a South Korean former tennis player.

Kim featured in seven Federation Cup ties for South Korea, from 1977 to 1979. She had a Federation Cup win over Japan's Naoko Sato in 1977, who earlier in the year had reached the Australian Open quarter-finals.

At the 1982 Asian Games, which were held in New Delhi, Kim won two gold medals for South Korea. She won one gold partnering Shin Soon-ho in the women's doubles and the other in the team event.

References

External links
 
 

1958 births
Living people
South Korean female tennis players
Asian Games gold medalists for South Korea
Asian Games silver medalists for South Korea
Asian Games medalists in tennis
Medalists at the 1978 Asian Games
Medalists at the 1982 Asian Games
Tennis players at the 1978 Asian Games
Tennis players at the 1982 Asian Games
20th-century South Korean women